Deerfield Academy is an elite coeducational boarding preparatory school in Deerfield, Massachusetts. Founded in 1797, it is one of the oldest secondary schools in the United States.  It is a member of the Eight Schools Association, the Ten Schools Admissions Organization, and the Six Schools League.

Overview
It is a four-year college-preparatory school with approximately 650 students and about 125 faculty, all of whom live on or near campus during the school year. Deerfield had a 16.8% acceptance rate for the 2019–20 school year. Its endowment is $590 million.

The Academy grants $10.8 million per year to 36% of its students, meaning the average financial aid grant is $50,096 per year. The student body hails from 36 U.S. states and 47 foreign countries. As of 2017, 32% of the student body were nonwhite American domestic students, and an additional 12% were foreign nationals or US expats.

History

Deerfield Academy was founded in 1797 when Massachusetts Governor Samuel Adams granted a charter to found a school in the town of Deerfield. It began to educate students in 1799. The school was prestigious, and graduates occupied many congressional and gubernatorial seats in New England. By the end of the 19th century, industrialization had economically hurt Deerfield, which was rural. The board of trustees was considering closing the Academy, as only nine students remained.

In 1902, Deerfield appointed Frank Boyden as headmaster. Boyden also emphasized athletics as a component of education, sometimes playing on varsity squads that lacked players. Boyden retired in 1968.

David M. Pynchon was appointed headmaster after Boyden. He expanded the curriculum, updated the school buildings, and expanded the endowment.

In 1989, the Academy reestablished coeducation, which Boyden had discontinued in 1948. At the time male students had protested the decision.

Eric Widmer '57 served as headmaster from 1994 to 2006. He stepped down in June 2006 and soon after assumed the position of Founding Headmaster at King's Academy in Madaba, Jordan, a school inspired in part by HM King Abdullah II's Deerfield years in the 1980s. It opened in the fall of 2007.

Margarita Curtis, previously Dean of Studies at Phillips Andover, was the first woman to hold the position of Head of School at Deerfield Academy, retiring in 2019.

The current Head of School is John Austin, former Head of School at King's Academy in Madaba, Jordan.

Academics 
Deerfield Academy follows a trimester system, in which the school year is divided into three academic grading periods. Deerfield students take a full liberal arts curriculum, including English, history, foreign language, mathematics, laboratory science, visual and performing arts, and philosophy and religion. However, required courses are kept at a minimum to allow students to take more courses in the subjects that interest them most.

Most courses last the entire year, whereas others can last for one to two terms. The required course load is five graded courses per term, but students may petition the Academic Dean to take a sixth graded course if desired. There are no Saturday classes, and classes are held from Monday to Friday, typically from 8:30 am to 2:55 pm. On Wednesdays, classes end at 12:45 pm to accommodate athletic events, as well as to provide more time for clubs and community service.

Deerfield does not rank students. Academic work is graded on a scale where the minimum passing grade is 60 and the median grades are between 85 and 90. A trimester average of 90.0 or above garners Honors distinction, whereas a trimester average of 93.0 or above garners High Honors distinction.

Matriculation 
Well over a quarter of Deerfield students matriculate into the Ivy League, MIT, and Stanford. The most-attended colleges from 2001–2016 were Yale, Georgetown, Cornell, Dartmouth, UVA, and Harvard.

Co-curricular activities

Students are required to participate in a co-curricular activity each trimester. Some options include competitive or intramural sports, community service, dance, theatrical productions every term, yearbook, and many more.

Music 
Music facilities include the Elizabeth Wachsman Concert Hall, a professional recording studio, and numerous rehearsal and practice rooms. In recent years, Deerfield music students have excelled in competition, winning first prize in the Springfield Symphony Orchestra's Rhodes Solo Concerto Competition (2019), the Boston Philharmonic Youth Orchestra's Solo Competition (2019), and the Boston Symphony Orchestra's Solo Concerto Competition (2019), as well as placing second in the J.Y. Park Piano Competition at Western Connecticut State University (2019). 

Participants of the program have been accepted to competitive music training programs that include the Perlman Music Program, Meadowmount School of Music, Heifetz International Music Institute, and Bowdoin International Music Festival. Deerfield musicians have matriculated at Harvard and Stanford Universities, among others.

Athletics
Deerfield athletic teams compete with boarding schools and other private schools throughout New England. Deerfield is also a member of the New England Preparatory School Athletic Council (NEPSAC).

Fall sports
Football
Cross country
Field hockey
Soccer
Volleyball
Water polo

Winter sports
Alpine skiing
Basketball
Ice hockey
Squash
Swimming and diving
Wrestling

Spring sports
Baseball
Crew
Cycling
Field lacrosse
Golf
Softball
Tennis
Track and field
Water polo
Ultimate Frisbee

Around 2010 Deerfield Academy's lacrosse program had success, and was a perennial contender, along with rival Salisbury School, for the New England title.  In 2009 Salisbury defeated Deerfield 7–6, resulting in a shared New England Championship title.  In 2010 Salisbury defeated Deerfield 9–6. Salisbury went on to win the New England title. However, in 2011 Deerfield beat Salisbury 11–7 in the penultimate game of their season. Deerfield went on to beat Exeter in the last game of their season, securing both an undefeated season and the New England title. They secured the ranking of number one in the state of Massachusetts, and a ranking of number three in the nation. Deerfield's golf, men's water polo, and swimming teams are strong. In 2008 Deerfield held the New England Prep School Championship title for men's swimming, men's water polo, and golf.

Extracurricular activities 
In addition to required co-curricular activities, many students are involved in at least one of the more than 50 student-run clubs or organizations.

Traditions

Hike to the Rock 
Each fall, the Head of School hikes with all the freshmen to the Rock, which is a ridge overlooking the Pocumtuck Valley. Students return many times to the Rock throughout their time at Deerfield, and a trip to the Rock is one of many seniors' last activities.

Sit-down meals 
Seven times a week, the entire Deerfield community gathers in the Dining Hall for a family-style meal. Each round table consists of nine students and one faculty member. After every Sunday night dinner, the entire student body sings the Deerfield Evensong.

Choate Day 
"Choate Day" occurs during the final weekend of the fall sports season. Deerfield competes with Choate in every sport at both varsity and sub-varsity levels. The tradition began in 1922 with an exchange of letters between Deerfield head Frank Boyden and Choate head George St. John. Since then, busloads (in the early years, trainloads) of students have made the 80-mile journey along the Connecticut River valley to cheer their teams on the rival's campus.

In the days leading up to the event, rallies and activities are held at both schools. And each campus is decorated in spirited banners and signs to excite the students during the week leading up to the events. At Choate the Boar Pen cheerleaders are selected and a fire-breathing dragon is ignited. At Deerfield in the Main Auditorium, the cheerleaders put on skits mocking their opponents, and there are speeches given by Captain Deerfield, the step team, and the head cheerleaders. In the athletic building, the school seal is encircled by students so that Choate athletes will not tread on it. When events at the Auditorium end, the student body rushes to the lower fields where a bonfire, topped by a burning C, awaits it. Captain Deerfield, the varsity captains, and the cheerleaders pump up the student body with Deerfield cheers and chants.

Stepping-Up Bonfire 
The Stepping-Up Bonfire is an event that takes place during the night of Commencement day, after the graduating senior class has departed from campus. Students gather on the Lower Fields and celebrate the coming year in a bonfire. This event is also the place of the debut of the new Captain Deerfield and an opportunity for the Junior Cheerleaders to take the lead. The bonfire has been followed up by a dance for the rising seniors.

School Meeting 
Every Wednesday morning, the entire student body and faculty gather in the Hess Auditorium. Students sit by year, and after each class shouts its own cheer, students sing the Deerfield fight song. School Meetings contain announcements, student performances, and invited speakers.

Shriv at the Riv 
In the fall and spring, students gather for a morning dip in the Deerfield River on the lower level of campus. Meeting at the historic horse’s head at 6:15 am, students bundle up and trek down to the athletic fields where the river runs adjacent. The tradition, though rather new, has become a favorite of students. Many believe it is a great way to wake up for the day and a wonderful way to build camaraderie within the student body.

Facilities

Academic facilities 
 The Arms Building houses the English department. It was designed by Charles Platt in 1933 and donated by Jennie Maria Arms Sheldon. 
 The Boyden Library is a three-story library that originally opened in 1968 and was named in honor of former headmaster Frank L. Boyden and his wife Helen Childs Boyden. The library was renovated in 2015. After renovations, the Boyden Library now houses the College Advising Office, as well as the Academic Dean's Office. The library also houses the Center for Service and Global Citizenship (CSGC). It also contains an open Innovation Lab, which allows students to construct objects of their own design. 
 The Hess Center for the Arts was renovated in 2014 and contains facilities for the visual and performing arts. The Hess Center contains the Hess Auditorium (often called the "Large Aud"), where weekly School Meetings are held. There are two galleries, the von Auersperg Gallery and the Hilson Gallery, which both exhibit student, faculty, and outside artwork. The orchestral and choral groups perform every trimester in the Elizabeth Wachsman Concert Hall. The Reid Black Box Theater is home to the theater program's productions. 
 The Kendall Classroom Building houses the Language Department. It contains a language lab and a 160-seat auditorium (often called the "Small Aud") and is where the school newspaper and yearbook are written.
 The Koch Center houses the Math Department, Science Department, and Computer Science Department, as well as the Information Technology Services and Communications offices. The Koch Center contains a planetarium and the Garonzik Auditorium, which contains 225 seats. The Koch center also includes an astronomy viewing terrace and the Louis Cafe.
 The Main School Building was completed in 1931 and initially served as the classroom building for the entire school. The Main School Building houses the Admission and Financial Aid Office, and prospective students wait in the Caswell Library. After renovations in the 1980s, the building houses the History Department, Philosophy & Religion Department, and administrative offices.

Other facilities 
 The Hitchcock House is the Academy bookstore.
 The Dining Hall is where Deerfield hosts its traditional sit-down meals.
 The 3-Floor D.S. Chen Health Center was opened in 2019 and is staffed 24/7. It contains a fully equipped examination and inpatient facility as well as counseling and is prepared to handle emergency response services, supported by the Deerfield Security team.
 The Physical Plant
 The Shipping and Receiving Office

Athletic facilities

Outdoor facilities 
 Fair Family Field is a turf field.
 Headmaster's Field is a baseball field.
 Jamie Kapteyn Field
 Jim Smith Field is used by the varsity football team in the fall and boys varsity lacrosse team in the spring.
 Lower Level & South Division Field comprise 90 acres of athletic fields. They are home to boys varsity soccer, JV soccer, and field hockey teams in the fall and JV lacrosse in the spring. 
 Rowland Family Field is used for varsity field hockey.
 There are 21 tennis courts.
 The track is an eight-lane 10 mm full pour track surface with two synthetic turf fields.

Indoor facilities 
 The David H. Koch Natatorium holds an eight-lane pool and separate diving well.
 The Dewey Squash Courts house 10 international squash courts
 The East & West Gyms house 3 basketball courts and are used by the varsity and JV volleyball teams in the fall and JV basketball teams in the winter.
 The Fitness Center contains cardiovascular and weight machines, as well as free weights.
 The Ice Rink is used by the varsity and JV hockey teams.
 The Kravis Room is used for wrestling.

Dormitories 
Deerfield has 15 dormitories: Barton, Bewkes (now a faculty residence), DeNunzio, Dewey, Field, Harold  Smith, John Louis, John Williams, Johnson-Doubleday, Louis-Marx, Mather, McAlister, Pocumtuck, Rosenwald-Shumway, Scaife, and the newly christened O'Byrne Curtis—named for retiring Head of School Margarita O'Byrne Curtis. Every dorm is single-sex, and a faculty resident lives on each hall. Juniors and seniors live together in the same dorms, whereas sophomores live in their own dorms. Since 2015, all 100 incoming ninth-graders have been housed together in the Ninth-Grade Village, which consists of two single-sex dormitories connected by a large common room.

Deerfield Academy Press
The Deerfield Academy Press was founded in May 1997 with the publication of Deerfield 1797-1997: A Pictorial History of the Academy, the first written history of the school. The press also provides an outlet for student writings in English, history, and foreign languages.

Notable alumni

Faculty sexual abuse and Deerfield's response
In 2004 an alumnus revealed to Deerfield's then headmaster Eric Widmer that he had been sexually abused in the Winter of 1983 by faculty member Peter Hindle.  Widmer responded sympathetically but did not press for details. The school was aware a parent previously raised concerns about Hindle in the 1980s, and had responded with written and verbal warnings.  Nearly a decade later in 2012 the alumnus raised the matter again, this time with headmaster Margarita Curtis, who he says "displayed clear moral authority and offered unconditional support from the start."

An investigation by the school's lawyers confirmed the allegations and uncovered more: In late March 2013 the school published information that two former faculty members had engaged in multiple sexual contacts with students: Peter Hindle who taught at the school from 1956 to his 2000 retirement, and Bryce Lambert who retired in 1990 and had died in 2007. The school stripped Hindle's name from an endowed mathematics teaching chair and a school squash court, and barred him from campus events. A subsequent criminal investigation by the District Attorney's office revealed that at least four teachers, three deceased and one still alive, had engaged in sexual conduct considered "criminal in nature" with students extending back into the 1950s. Their deaths, and the statute of limitations, precluded pursuing criminal charges.

Deerfield spokesman David Thiel said  "I think you saw from us an amount of transparency when this came to light that was unusual, and I hope that sets a good example for institutions and helps to assure that students are safer everywhere."

In books and popular culture 
In the book The Headmaster (1966), author John McPhee reviews the life and work of Deerfield's most famous, formative headmaster, Frank Boyden, last of the "magnanimous despots who... created enduring schools through their own individual energies, maintained them under their own absolute rules, and left them forever imprinted with their own personalities." McPhee spent a year at Deerfield as a postgraduate student.

John Gunther's book Death Be Not Proud (1949) discusses the long struggle of his son John Gunther Jr. (called "Johnny") a Deerfield student, against a deadly brain tumor. In the story, Deerfield students gave the boy an ovation as he managed to walk the church aisle to receive the diploma he had earned despite the cancer. The book was later made into the 1975 movie Death Be Not Proud, starring Robby Benson as Johnny Gunther.

In Martin Scorsese's film The Departed (2006), William "Billy" Costigan (Leonardo DiCaprio) is said to have attended Deerfield during his youth, though he was expelled for "whaling on a gym teacher with a folding chair."

Deerfield alumnus and later Horace Mann School history teacher Andrew Trees wrote a satiric novel titled Academy X (2007), a tale of corrupt "transcript primping" set in an unnamed prep school. After publication of the novel Horace Mann declined to renew Mr. Trees' teaching contract. The resulting controversy over academic freedom was reported in The New York Times article, "Private School, Public Fuss".

See also

Heads of Deerfield Academy
List of notable Deerfield alumni

References

Further reading
 Cooke, Brian P.  Frank Boyden of Deerfield: The Vision and Politics of an Educational Idealist. Lanham, Md.: Madison Books (1994)
 Cookson, Peter W. Preparing For Power: America's Elite Boarding Schools (1985)
 
 McLachlan, James. American Boarding Schools A Historical Study (1970)
 McPhee, John. The Headmaster: Frank L. Boyden (1966) 
 Moorhead, Andrea D. and Moorhead, Robert K. Deerfield, 1797-1997: A Pictorial History of the Academy (1997)

External links
 
 
 Deerfield Academy on Instagram. Archived from the original on ghostarchive.org.

1797 establishments in Massachusetts
Boarding schools in Massachusetts
Co-educational boarding schools

Deerfield, Massachusetts
Educational institutions established in 1797
Private high schools in Massachusetts
Private preparatory schools in Massachusetts
Round Square schools
School sexual abuse scandals
Schools in Franklin County, Massachusetts
Six Schools League